The FIS Nordic World Ski Championships 1993 took place 19–28 February 1993 in Falun, Sweden, for the third time (1954, 1974). This event saw the creation of the combined pursuit where competitors would skate one distance in the classical interval style (10 km: men, 5 km: women) one day, then follow the next day in the freestyle pursuit (15 km: men, 10 km: women) with the first distance winner going first in the pursuit. Additionally it was the first competition since the breakup of the Soviet Union in late 1991 and the first competition with Czechoslovakia having been split up as the Czech Republic and Slovakia, however, the two nations competed as combined teams in women's relay in cross-country skiing and team large hill in ski jumping.

Men's cross-country

10 km classical 
22 February 1993

10 km + 15 km combined pursuit 
24 February 1993

Dæhlie edged Smirnov at the finish line to earn the gold medal. Smirnov later stated that he lost out to Dæhlie by "only 16 centimeters".

30 km classical 
20 February 1993

50 km freestyle 
28 February 1993

4 × 10 km relay
26 February 1993

Women's cross-country

5 km classical 
21 February 1993

5 km + 10 km combined pursuit 
23 February 1993

15 km classical 
19 February 1993

Välbe was the first Russian to win a gold medal in the aftermath of the Soviet Union's breakup in late 1991.

30 km freestyle 
27 February 1993

4 × 5 km relay
25 February 1993

Men's Nordic combined

15 km individual Gundersen
18 February 1993

3 × 10 km team
25 February 1993

Japan's four-minute victory margin at this event, followed by their nearly five-minute victory at the Winter Olympics in Lillehammer the following year, would lead the FIS to change the Nordic combined team event from a 3 x 10 km relay to a 4 x 5 km relay that would become effective at the FIS Nordic World Ski Championships 1995 in Thunder Bay and the 1998 Winter Olympics in Nagano. This was in an effort to lessen the emphasis on the ski jumping part of the competition.

Men's ski jumping

Individual normal hill 
27 February 1993

Individual large hill 
21 February 1993

Sakala was the first Czech to medal following Czechoslovakia's breakup earlier that year into the Czech Republic and Slovakia.

Team large hill
23 February 1993

The Czech Republic and Slovakia competed as a combined team despite their countries agreement to split from Czechoslovakia on 25 November 1992. The country's split was made after the team had been selected prior to the championships.

Medal table
Medal winners by nation.

References
FIS 1993 cross country results
FIS 1993 Nordic combined results
FIS 1993 ski jumping results

External links

FIS Nordic World Ski Championships  at SVT's open archive 

FIS Nordic World Ski Championships
Nordic Skiing
1993 in Nordic combined
1993 in Swedish sport
February 1993 sports events in Europe
Nordic skiing competitions in Sweden
Sports competitions in Falun